Eden FM is a community radio station serving Penrith and the Eden Valley in Cumbria. The station is based in Cumbria House, Gilwilly Road, Penrith, Cumbria. The station founder was Lee Quinn, who was also the founder of Meridian FM Community Radio in East Grinstead, Sussex.

The campaign for a local station was launched in June 2010 by Lee Quinn, through launching a community magazine, the Eden Local, which was posted through doors in Penrith and the Eden Valley. The first Eden FM studios were switched on in November 2011.

Run by volunteers, the non-profit organisation, applied to Ofcom for a full-time community radio licence on an FM frequency in the community radio licensing: third round for the North East of England and Cumbria.

Currently broadcasting full-time online and on 107.5 FM, the station completed three 28-day restricted service licence broadcasts in November - December 2011, followed by a couple more in June - July 2012 and November - December 2012.

Eden FM submitted an application for a full-time licence in January 2013 and was awarded a 5-year licence in October of that year.

To celebrate the launch of the station full-time, Eden FM Radio Ltd, raised the funds to have a bespoke Penrith and Eden Valley Monopoly Board game produced, which reflected on the local towns and villages covered by Eden FM Radio include Penrith, Appleby-in-Westmorland, Langwathby, Greystoke, Shap, Skelton and Melmerby.

Eden FM Radio's community licence was renewed for a further five years in 2019 to 2024. In 2019 it was also granted extensions to its 107.5 FM frequency via a new transmission site in Penrith and it was allocated an additional frequency   to better serve the upper Eden areas with an additional transmission site.

See also 
 List of radio stations in the United Kingdom
 Community radio

References

External links 
 Eden FM Website

Community radio stations in the United Kingdom
Eden FM Radio
Radio stations in Cumbria
Radio stations established in 2010